Abagovomab is a mouse anti-idiotype monoclonal antibody whose variable epitope mirrors a tumour antigen (CA-125) highly expressed in the epithelial ovarian cancer. Abagovomab does not bind directly to CA-125, but it works as a "surrogate" antigen, enabling the immune system to identify and attack tumour cells displaying the CA-125 protein. Through this, it is hoped that the body's immune system may be able to combat any remaining individual tumour cells and thus prevent recurrence of the disease.

Current status 
Abagovomab is under clinical development in patients with advanced ovarian cancer, as consolidation of the remission status obtained following surgery and standard platinum and taxane first line chemotherapy.

Phase II 
In a Phase II study on 119 patients with advanced ovarian cancer in which the standard therapies had already been ineffective, treatment with abagovomab led to a prolongation of survival time (23.4 months compared to 4.9 months) in those patients who responded to the vaccination, i.e. those in whom the formation of antibodies against the tumour was proven (almost 70% of patients).
The vaccine showed hardly any side effects in preliminary studies.

Ovarian cancer 
Ovarian cancer is the most malignant tumour of the female reproductive organs. After endometrial cancer, it is the second most common genital tumour in women with c. 9,000 women newly affected each year and, because of its aggressiveness, it has the highest mortality rate. This is due in part to the fact that there is no screening examination for early detection, and that the disease is therefore usually only discovered at an advanced stage, and in part to the tumour's tendency, although responding well to initial treatment, to recur again later.

In spite of initially successful treatment with surgery and chemotherapy, which forces back the tumour "completely", i.e. into no longer visible residues, there is a relapse of the disease (recurrence) in more than half the women affected. Today, no further therapy would be conducted in this situation as long as the disease did not occur again, i.e. clinical monitoring of the symptom-free patients as part of follow-up care is the current standard procedure.
In this time-window of the patient's history so called ‘watch and wait’ abagovomab is potentially capable of deferring or even preventing the occurrence of the relapse.

Development
Abagovomab has been developed by the pharmaceutical company Menarini. A multicenter clinical trial, internationally known as MIMOSA (Monoclonal antibody Immunotherapy for Malignancies of the Ovary by Subcutaneous Abagovomab), in which Abagovomab will be administered as maintenance therapy (after first line therapy with surgery and chemotherapy), is ongoing in patients with ovarian cancer.
Nine hundred women in whom the ovarian tumour was removed by surgery and standard chemotherapy with paclitaxel and carboplatin can be enrolled in the MIMOSA study, involving eight countries throughout the world (Germany, United States, Italy, Poland, Czech Republic, Spain, Hungary and Belgium) in more than 120 experienced clinical sites.

Phase III of the trial showed no evidence of slowing ovarian cancer with a monoclonal antibody against CA125. Price of the vaccine is $3009.3.

References

Further reading

External links 
 Menarini page about abagovomab
 Menarini page about MIMOSA project
 Clinical trial MIMOSA
  Clinical trial MIMOSA

Monoclonal antibodies for tumors
Experimental cancer drugs
Abandoned drugs